Ritter (i. e. personal knight) Karl Wilhelm von Gümbel (11 February 1823 – 18 June 1898), German geologist, was born at Dannenfels, in the Palatinate of the Rhine, and is known chiefly by his researches on the geology of Bavaria. He was the brother of bryologist Wilhelm Theodor Gümbel (1812–1858).

He received a practical and scientific education in mining at Munich and Heidelberg, taking the degree of Ph.D. at Munich in 1862; and he was engaged for a time at the colliery of St Ingbert and as a surveyor in that district. In 1851, when the Geological Survey of Bavaria was instituted, Gumbel was appointed chief geologist; in 1863 he was made honorary professor of geognosy and surveying at the university of Munich, and in 1879, Oberberg director of the Bavarian mining department with which the Geological Survey was incorporated.

His geological map of Bavaria appeared in 1858, and the official memoir descriptive of the detailed work, entitled Geognoslische Beschreibung des Konigreichs Bayern was issued in three parts (1861, 1868 and 1879). He subsequently published his Geologie von Bayern in 2 vols. (1884-1894), an elaborate treatise on geology, with special reference to the geology of Bavaria.

In the course of his long and active career he engaged in much palaeontological work: he studied the fauna of the Triassic and in 1861 introduced the term Rhaetic for the uppermost division of that system; he supported at first the view of the organic nature of Eozoon canadense (1866 and 1876), he devoted special attention to Foraminifera, and described those of the Eocene strata of the northern Alps (1868); he dealt also with Receptaculites (1875) which he regarded as a genus belonging to the Foraminifera. In 1875 and 1878 he published "Über die Beschaffenheit des Steinmeteoriten vom Fall am 12. Februar 1875 in der Grafschaft Iowa Nordamerika" and "Über die in Bayern gefundenen Steinmeteoriten", respectively, both important qualitative and quantitative essays on the physical properties of meteorites.

Selected works 
 "Über die Beschaffenheit des Steinmeteoriten vom Fall am 12. Februar 1875 in der Grafschaft Iowa Nordamerika", 1875 – About the Nature of the Stone Meteorites from the Fall of February 12, 1875 in the County of Iowa, North America.
 "Über die in Bayern gefundenen Steinmeteoriten", 1878 – About the Stone Meteorites Found in Bavaria.

References

1823 births
1898 deaths
19th-century German geologists
People from Donnersbergkreis